Caulker is a surname. Notable people with the surname include:

Sierra Leone
The Caulkers are a prominent family in Sierra Leone descended from the Englishman Thomas Corker (died 1700). Members have included:
Stephen Caulker (died 1810), African Chief
Richard Conray-Ba Caulker, (18??- 1900) African Chief of the Bumpe Chiefdom 1864-1888
Thomas Caulker (1846–1859), son of the above who died in London
 Thomas Neale-Caulker (died 1898), African Chief
 Charles B. Caulker
Christian Caulker (born 1988), Sierra Leonean footballer

Other
Steven Caulker (born 1991), English footballer